Pictorial maps (also known as illustrated maps, panoramic maps, perspective maps, bird’s-eye view maps, and geopictorial maps) depict a given territory with a more artistic rather than technical style. It is a type of map in contrast to road map, atlas, or topographic map. The cartography can be a sophisticated 3-D perspective landscape or a simple map graphic enlivened with illustrations of buildings, people and animals. They can feature all sorts of varied topics like historical events, legendary figures or local agricultural products and cover anything from an entire continent to a college campus. Drawn by specialized artists and illustrators, pictorial maps are a rich, centuries-old tradition and a diverse art form that ranges from cartoon maps on restaurant placemats to treasured art prints in museums.

Pictorial maps usually show an area as if viewed from above at an oblique angle. They are not generally drawn to scale in order to show street patterns, individual buildings, and major landscape features in perspective. While regular maps focus on the accurate rendition of distances, pictorial maps enhance landmarks and often incorporate a complex interplay of different scales into one image in order to give the viewer a more familiar sense of recognition. With an emphasis on objects and style, these maps cover an artistic spectrum from childlike caricature to spectacular landscape graphic, with the better ones being attractive, informative and highly accurate. Some require thousands of hours to produce.

The history and tradition of pictorial maps 

The history of pictorial maps overlaps much with the history of cartography in general, and ancient artifacts suggest that pictorial mapping has been around since recorded history began.

In Medieval cartography, pictorial icons as well as religious and historical ideas usually overshadowed accurate geographic proportions. A classic example of this is the T and O map, which represented the three known continents in the form of a cross, with Jerusalem at its center. The more precise art of illustrating detailed bird’s-eye-view urban landscapes flourished during the European Renaissance.  As emerging trade centers such as Venice began to prosper, local rulers commissioned artists to develop pictorial overviews of their towns to help them organize trade fairs and direct the increasing flow of visiting merchants. When printing came around, pictorial maps evolved into some of the earliest forms of advertising as cities competed amongst themselves to attract larger shares of the known world’s commerce.

Later, during the Age of Exploration, maps became progressively more accurate for navigation needs and were often sprinkled with sketches and drawings such as sailing ships showing the direction of trade winds, little trees and mounds to represent forests and mountains and, of course, plenty of sea creatures and  exotic natives, much of them imaginary.  As the need for geographical accuracy increased, these illustrations gradually slipped off the map and onto the borders and eventually disappeared altogether in the wake of modern scientific cartography.

19th century

As cartography evolved, the pictorial art form went its own way and regained popularity in the 19th century with the development of the railroads. Between 1825 and 1875, the production and collection of panoramic maps of cities rose to something of a mania. In the U.S. alone, thousands of panoramic maps were produced. The leading panoramic map artists in the U.S.A. were Herman Brosius, Camille N. Drie, Thaddeus Mortimer Fowler, Paul Giraud, Augustus Koch, D. D. Morse, Henry Welge, and A. L. Westyard. Sometimes artistic exaggeration bordered on the fraudulent, as some travelers were drawn by images of idyllic, bustling towns with humming factories only to find a sad little bunch of mud-soaked shacks when they got there. A vast collection of these prints is maintained by the Library of Congress, and many of the more beautiful ones continue to be reprinted and sold to this day.

20th century
 
With the growth of tourism, pictorial mapmaking reappeared as a popular culture art form in the 1920s through the 1950s, often with a whimsical Art Deco style that reflects the period. Many of these maps were commissioned by commercial entities (banks, oil companies, &c.), and in many cases the artists (often draftsmen working for architecture firms) are not attributed. One of the early examples of the pictorial maps was published in the German arts magazine Das Plakat. These were the reproductions of two political cartoon maps of Europe which had been produced by Paul Hadol in 1870 and by Walter Trier. A number of such maps are still published (originals going for hundreds or thousands of dollars today). Among the best-known maps of this era today are the 1926 Manhattan map of C. V. Farrow, and the Western maps of Jo Mora

Another resurgence occurred in the 1970s and 80s. This was the heyday of companies like Archar and Descartes who produced hundreds of colorful promotional maps of mainly American and Canadian cities. Local businesses were flatteringly drawn on these "Character maps" with their logos proudly embedded on their buildings.

Pictorial map-makers up to modern times 

Many mapmakers traveled from city to city enlisting the support of local merchants, industrialists and civic organizations, whose endorsement would of course guarantee a prominent place for their properties on the map.

Edwin Whitefield for instance, one of the more prolific 19th-century American pictorial map artists, would require about 200 subscribers before he put pen to paper.  Once he secured the profitability of the venture, Whitefield would be seen all over town furiously sketching every building.  Then, choosing an imaginary aerial vantage point, he would integrate all his sketches into a complete and detailed drawing of the city. Then after that, say the chroniclers of the time, Whitefield would once again be seen furiously darting all over town to collect from all his sponsors.
Says Jean-Louis Rheault, a contemporary pictorial map illustrator: "Pictorial maps - with their emphasis on what's important and eye-catching - make it easier to figure out what's where."

Anthropomorphic maps 
A type of pictorial maps are maps that use anthropomorphic images. Anthropomorphic maps date back to when Sebastian Münster used a queen to depict Europe in 1570. The map, The Man of Commerce, by Augustus F. McKay is the earliest anthropomorphic map known of in the United States, created in 1889.

See also

 
 
 
 
 
 
 
 
 
 
 
 
 
 
 
  (GIS)
 
 
 
 
 
 
 
 
 , a free project mapping the world's roads using GPS

References

 Panoramic Maps Collection
 History of Cartography

Further reading

External links

Pictorial Map Collection, St. Louis Public Library Digital Collections
1936 Pictorial Map of London
 Historic Cities
 History of Cartography
 Mapping History
 Panoramic maps, Library of Congress 
See Pictorial Maps in Persuasive Cartography, The PJ Mode Collection, Cornell University Library
 Bird's Eye View Map of Budapest

Infographics
Map types